Hermann Beyfuss (also Beyfus; 7 May 1857 – 2 March 1898) was an Austrian painter.

Life 
Hermann Beyfuss was born in Vienna on 7 May 1857. He studied from 1874 at the Academy of Fine Arts, Vienna under Christian Griepenkerl and Carl Wurzinger; he also studied at the Academy of Fine Arts, Munich. He was active in Vienna; and in 1885 became a member of the Vienna Künstlerhaus, where he exhibited mainly genre scenes and portraits. He died in Vienna on 2 March 1898.

Beyfusgasse 
Beyfusgasse, a Viennese street in Inzersdorf, Liesing, was named in 1954 after the painter. It was previously called Siedlergasse.

Gallery

References

Sources 

 Autengruber, Peter (2014). Lexikon der Wiener Straßennamen. Bedeutung, Herkunft, Hintergrundinformation frühere Bezeichnung(en). 9th ed. Vienna: Pichler-Verlag. p. 48.
 Trier, Dankmar (2021). "Beyfus, Hermann". In Beyer, Andreas; Savoy, Bénédicte; Tegethoff, Wolf (eds.). Allgemeines Künstlerlexikon - International Artist Database - Online. Berlin, New York: K. G. Saur. Retrieved 14 October 2022.
 Thieme, Ulrich; Becker, Felix, eds. (1909). "Beyfus, Hermann". In Allgemeines Lexikon der Bildenden Künstler von der Antike bis zur Gegenwart. Vol. 3: Bassano–Bickham. Leipzig: E. A Seemann. p. 571.

Further reading 

 Gaugusch, Georg (2011). Wer einmal war. Das jüdische Großbürgertum Wiens 1800–1938. Vol. 1: A-K. Vienna: Amalthea. p. 1258. .
 Santifaller, Leo; Obermeyer-Marnach, Eva, eds. (1957). "Beyfuss, Hermann". In Österreichisches Biographisches Lexikon 1815–1950 (ÖBL). Vol. 1. Vienna: Österreichischen Akademie der Wissenschaften. p. 80.

1857 births
1898 deaths
19th-century Austrian painters
People from Vienna